Robert Hill (c.1361–1423) of Spaxton, Somerset was four times MP for Somerset, in 1414 and 1415 jointly with Sir Hugh Luttrell (c.1364–1428) of Dunster Castle, and then in 1416 and 1419.

He was four times Sheriff of Somerset and Dorset in 1408, 1412, 1419 and 1422.

He was fined for refusing a knighthood.

Robert Hill of Spaxton died 25 April 1423 and was buried in Buckland church, ‘before and under the high altar near the middle' near his wife. He was succeeded by his only son, John Hill.

Origins
He was the son of Sir John Hill (died 1408), Justice of the King's Bench from 1389 to 1407, of Kytton in the parish of Holcombe Rogus, and of Hill's Court, Exeter, both in Devon.

Marriage
He married Isabel Fitchet, daughter and sole heiress of Sir Thomas Fitchet of Spaxton. They had children including:
John Hill of Spaxton, b.1401 d.1434 MP
Elizabeth Hill

References

1423 deaths
English MPs November 1414
English MPs 1415
English MPs March 1416
English MPs 1419